The bailo and captain of Negroponte was the representative of the Republic of Venice stationed at Chalcis (Negroponte) on the island of Euboea. The bailo played an important role as the mediator between, and de facto overlord of, the triarchs of Euboea, who had their common residence in Negroponte. The triarchies were created by the division of the island between three rulers (triarchs) after its conquest following the Fourth Crusade (1204).

The Venetian title bailo (plural baili) derives from the Latin baiulus. In English, it may be translated bailiff, or otherwise rendered as bailey, baili, bailie, bailli or baillie.

List of baili
Notes: maggiore = "the elder"; q. = quondam = "son of the late"

1216–???? Pietro Barbo il Zanco
1222–1224 Benedetto Falier
1224–1252 ????
1252–1254 Leone Sanudo
1254–1256 Paolo Gradenigo
1256–1258 Marco Gradenigo
1258 Tommaso Giustiniani
1258–1261 Andrea Barozzi
1261–1263 Andrea Barbarigo
1263–1265 Nicolò Barbarigo
1265–1266 Gilberto Dandolo
1266–1267 Filippo Orio
1268–1270 Andrea Dandolo (Hopf puts him in 1268–1269)
? 1269–1271 Andrea Zeno
1270–1271 Andrea Barozzi (not in Hopf)
1271–1273 Nicolò Miglani
1273–1274 Marco Bembo (Hopf puts him in 1267–1268)
1273/4–1275 Vettore Dolfin
1275–1276 Nicolò Quirini
? 1276–1277 Andrea Dandolo Beretta
1276–1277 Pietro Zeno (Hopf puts him in 1277–1278)
1277–1279 Jacopo Dondulo (not in Hopf)
1278–1280 Nicolò Morosini Rosso
1280–1282 Nicolò Falier
1282–1283 Andrea Zeno
1283–1285 Giovanni Zeno
1285–1287 Jacopo da Molino
1287–1289 Marino Soranzo
1289–1291 Marco Michieli
1291–1293 Nicolò Giustiniani
1293–1295 ????
1295–1297 Jacopo II Barozzi
1297–1299 Francesco Contarini
1299–1300 Giovanni da Canale
1300–1302 Andrea Zeno
1302–1304 Francesco Dandolo
1304–1306 Pietro Mocenigo
1306–1308 Pietro Quirini Pizzagallo
1308–1310 Belletto Falier
1310–1312 Luigi Morosini
1312–1314 Enrico Dolfin
1314–1316 Gabriele Dandolo
1316–1317 Michele Morosini
1317–1319 Francesco Dandolo (second time)
1319–1321 Lodovico Morosini
1321–1322 Gabriele Dandolo
1322–1323 Marco Michieli
1323–1325 Marino Falier
1325–1327 Marco Minotto
1327–1329 Marco Gradenigo q. Pietro
1329–1331 Filippo Belegno
1331–1333 Pietro Zeno
1333–1335 Belello Civran
1335–1337 Nicolò Priuli
 1337 Pietro Quirini (not in the Rulers of Venice database)
1337–1338 Andrea Dandolo
 1338 Nicolò Priuli
1339–1341 Benedetto da Molin
1341–1343 Pancrazio Giustiniani
1343–1345 Nicolò Gradenigo
1345–1347 Marco Soranzo
1347–1349 Giovanni Dandolo
1349–1351 Tommaso Viaro
1351–1353 Nicolò Quirini
1353–1356 Michele Falier
1356–1358 Giovanni Dandolo
1358–1360 Pietro Morosini
1360–1362 Fantino Morosini
1362–1364 Pietro Gradenigo
1364–1366 Domenico Michieli
1366–1368 Giovanni Giustiniani
1368–1370 Andrea Zeno
1370–1372 Giovanni Dolfin
1372–1374 Bartolommeo Quirini
1374–1376 Pietro Mocenigo
1376–1378 Andrea Barbarigo
1378–1379 Carlo Zeno
1379–1381 Pantaleone Barbo
1381–1383 Andrea Zeno
1383–1384 Marino Storlado
1384–1386 Fantino Giorgio
1386–1387 Donato Trono
1387–1389 Saracino Dandolo
1389–1391 Guglielmo Quirini
1391–1393 Gabriele Emo
1393–1395 Andrea Bembo
1395–1397 Carlo Zeno (second time)
1397–1399 Giovanni Alberto
1399–1401 Nicolò Valaresso
1401–1402 Francesco Bembo
1402–1403 Tommaso Mocenigo
1403–1405 Bernardo Foscarini
1405–1408 Francesco Bembo
1408–1410 Nicolò Venier q. Sergio
1410–1412 Paolo Quirini q. Romeo
1412–1414 Benedetto Trevisani da San Barnaba
1414–1416 Nicolò Giorgio q. Bernardo
1416–1418 Vidale Miani maggiore
1418–1420 Nicolò Malipiero q. Perazzo
1420–1422 Marco Cornaro
1422–1424 Daniele Loredano q. Fantino
1424–1425 Donato Arimondo maggiore
1425–1427 Antonio Michieli maggiore
1427–1429 Andrea Capello maggiore
1429–1430 Nicolò Loredano q. Fantino
1430–1431 Luigi Polani (vicebailo)
1431–1432 Andrea Gabrieli
1432–1434 Maffio Donato q. Marco
1434–1436 Albano Sagredo maggiore
1436–1438 Melchiorre Grimani maggiore
1438–1440 Fantino Pisani maggiore
1440–1442 Nicolò Buono q. Alessandro
1442–1444 Bertuccio Civrano q. Pietro
1444–1446 Matteo Barbaro q. Antonio
1446–1448 Vettore Duodo maggiore
1448 Fantino Pisani
1448–1451 Giovanni Malipiero q. Perazzo
1451–1453 Lorenzo Onorati maggiore
1453–1454 Paolo Loredano
1454–1456 Angelo da Pesaro q. Nicolò
1454–1456 Carlo Morosini (capitano)
1456–1459 Girolamo Bembo maggiore
1456–1458 Francesco Loredano (capitano)
1458–1460 Paolo Barbarigo q. Nicolò (capitano)
1459–1461 Leone Venier
1460–1462 Antonio Quirini q. Quirino
1461–1463 Leonardo Calbo q. Zanotto
1462–1464 Giovanni Dandolo q. Benedetto
1463–1465 Fantino Giorgio q. Giovanni
1464–1466 Giovanni Bembo q. Ettore
1465–1468 Francesco Gradenigo q. Jacopo
1466–1467 Giovanni Bondumier q. Antonio (capitano)
1467–1469 Nicolò da Canale (capitano)
1468–1470 Paolo Erizzo q. Marco
1469–1470 Luigi Calbo q. Zanotto (capitano)

See also
 Stato da Màr

Notes

Sources

 

 
Lists of governors
Republic of Venice-related lists